Binah (meaning "understanding";  Bīnā) is the third sephira on the kabbalistic Tree of Life. It sits on the level below Keter (in the formulations that include that sephirah), across from Chokhmah and  directly above Gevurah. It is usually given four paths: from Keter, Chokhmah, to Gevurah and Tiphereth.

Binah is associated with the color black.

Description

According to the Bahir: "The third (utterance): quarry of the Torah, treasury of wisdom, quarry of God's spirit, hewn out by the spirit of God. This teaches that God hewed out all the letters of the Torah, engraving them with the Spirit, casting His forms within it".

Binah is 'intuitive understanding', or 'contemplation'. It is likened to a 'palace of mirrors' that reflects the pure point of light of Chokhmah, wisdom, increasing and multiplying it in an infinite variety of ways. In this sense, it is the 'quarry', which is carved out by the light of wisdom. It is the womb, which gives shape to the Spirit of God. On a psychological level, Binah is "processed wisdom," also known as deductive reasoning. It is davar mitoch davar—understanding one idea from another idea. While Chokhmah is intellect that does not emanate from the rational process (it is either inspired or taught), Binah is the rational process that is innate in the person which works to develop an idea fully.

Binah is associated with the feminine. The Bahir states: "For you shall call Understanding a Mother."  Classical Jewish texts state Binah yeterah natun l'nashim ("an extra measure of Binah was given to women").

In its fully articulated form, Binah possesses two partzufim. The higher of these is referred to as Imma Ila'ah ("the higher mother"), whereas the lower is referred to as tevunah ("comprehension"). These two partzufim are referred to jointly as Imma ("the mother").

Qualities derived from Binah

Ethical qualities
In the medieval text the Tomer Devorah, Moses ben Jacob Cordovero elucidated the ethical qualities associated with each sefira, which one must attempt to imitate. The attribute associated with Binah is complete repentance, for 'just as Binah sweetens all severities and neutralizes their bitterness, one should repent and rectify all flaws'.

Non-Jewish associations
Western Esotericism

In Western esotericism, Binah is seen to take the raw force of Chokhmah, and to channel it into the various forms of creation.

The name of God associated with Binah is Jehovah Elohim, the archangel that presides over it is Tzaphkiel, the order of angels that resides in it are the Aralim (the Thrones) and the planet associated with it is Saturn.

Binah is related to the Yoni, the womb, the Priestess card in the occult tarot (according to A. E. Waite's Pictorial Key to the Tarot). Aleister Crowley's "Liber 777" associates it with Isis, Cybele, Demeter, Rhea, Woman, The Virgin Mary, Juno, Hecate, The "threes" of the Tarot, etc.

For its negative opposite of the Qliphoth, it is the demonic order Sathariel, ruled by the Archdemon Lucifuge Rofocale.

References

 Bahir, translated by Aryeh Kaplan (1995). Aronson.
 The Kabbalah Handbook, Gabriella Samuel (2007). Tarcher Penguin.

External links
 The Kabbalah Handbook, A Concise Encyclopedia of Terms and Concepts in Jewish Mysticism 
 Basics in Kabbalah, The Ten Sefirot: Binah (inner.org)
 Lessons in Tanya
 Kabbalah 101: Binah

Kabbalistic words and phrases
Sephirot
Hecate